Sara Errani was the defending champion, but lost in the final to her long-term doubles partner Roberta Vinci, 3–6, 6–3, 3–6.

Seeds

Draw

Finals

Top half

Bottom half

Qualifying

Seeds

Qualifiers

Qualifying draw

First qualifier

Second qualifier

Third qualifier

Fourth qualifier

References
 Main Draw
 Qualifying Draw

Internazionali Femminili di Palermo - Singles
2013 Singles